Howard Bristol  (August 14, 1902 – February 11, 1971) was an American set decorator. He was nominated for nine Academy Awards in the category Best Art Direction. He worked on 56 films between 1936 and 1968.

Selected filmography
Bristol was nominated for nine Academy Awards for Best Art Direction:

 Star! (1968)
 Thoroughly Modern Millie (1967)
 Flower Drum Song (1961)
 Guys and Dolls (1955)
 Hans Christian Andersen (1952)
 The Princess and the Pirate (1944)
 The North Star (1943)
 The Pride of the Yankees (1942)
 The Little Foxes (1941)

References

External links

American set decorators
1902 births
1971 deaths